Meeks Avenue Historic District is a national historic district located at Muncie, Delaware County, Indiana, USA. It encompasses 25 contributing buildings in a predominantly residential section of Muncie.  The district developed between about 1904 and 1939, and includes notable examples of Bungalow / American Craftsman style architecture.  A notable building is a service station constructed in 1939.

It was added to the National Register of Historic Places in 1999.

References

Historic districts on the National Register of Historic Places in Indiana
Historic districts in Muncie, Indiana
National Register of Historic Places in Muncie, Indiana